Thomas Martin Morgan (born 3 March 1970) is an Australian musician and songwriter. He fronts the 1990s indie pop group, Smudge (1991–present). He has written or co-written (with Evan Dando) songs for Boston power pop group, the Lemonheads. Morgan's other bands include Sneeze (1991–present), The Givegoods, Godstar (1991–95), Tofu Kok and Bambino Koresh (ca. 2012). He married Argentine-Spanish musician, Leticia Nischang (Sneeze, Bambino Koresh). As of September 2010, Morgan and Nischang were living in Maitland.

On 4 March 2013 Morgan issued his solo album, Orange Syringe, with Nischang providing backing vocals.

Discography 

 Orange Syringe (4 March 2013) Fire Records (FIRECD292, FV292LP)
 Local Knowledge (2001) Lake Midgeon (LMD001)

References

External links
An Interview with Tom Morgan at Oz Music Project, archived here
Interview with Tom Morgan at evandando.co.uk (December 2005)

1970 births
Living people
People from Maitland, New South Wales
Australian singer-songwriters
21st-century Australian singers